Sornsawan Phuvichit (born 16 February 1973) is a retired Thai breaststroke swimmer who won several gold medals at the South East Asian Games in 1987–1991. She competed at the 1992 Summer Olympics in the 100 m and 200 m breaststroke events, but failed to reach the finals. After retiring from swimming, she worked as a news anchor with Channel 7.

Phuvichit is married and has a daughter.

References

1973 births
Living people
Sornsawan Phuvichit
Female breaststroke swimmers
Sornsawan Phuvichit
Swimmers at the 1992 Summer Olympics
Southeast Asian Games medalists in swimming
Sornsawan Phuvichit
Swimmers at the 1994 Asian Games
Competitors at the 1987 Southeast Asian Games
Competitors at the 1989 Southeast Asian Games
Competitors at the 1991 Southeast Asian Games
Sornsawan Phuvichit